Bhupinder is an Indian male name and may refer to:

 Bhupinder Singh Hooda, Indian politician
 Bhupinder Nath Kirpal, Indian judge
 Bhupinder Singh (musician), Indian singer and musician
 Bhupinder Singh of Patiala (1891–1938), Maharaja of Patiala
 Bhupinder Singh, Sr. (born 1965), Indian cricketer

See also
 Bhupinder Singh (disambiguation)

Indian masculine given names